Derobrachus is a genus of beetles in the Cerambycidae. It contains the following species:

 Derobrachus agyleus Buquet, 1852
 Derobrachus apterus Bates, 1879
 Derobrachus asperatus Bates, 1878
 Derobrachus brevicollis Audinet-Serville, 1832
 Derobrachus chemsaki Santos-Silva, 2007
 Derobrachus cusucoensis Santos-Silva et al., 2018
 Derobrachus digueti Lameere, 1915
 Derobrachus dohrni Lameere, 1911
 Derobrachus drumonti Santos-Silva, 2007
 Derobrachus geminatus LeConte, 1853
 Derobrachus granulatus Bates, 1884
 Derobrachus hovorei Santos-Silva, 2007
 Derobrachus inaequalis (Bates, 1872)
 Derobrachus leechi Chemsak & Linsley, 1977
 Derobrachus lingafelteri Santos-Silva, 2007
 Derobrachus longicornis (Bates, 1872)
 Derobrachus megacles Bates, 1884
 Derobrachus procerus Thomson, 1860
 Derobrachus smithi Bates, 1892
 Derobrachus sulcicornis LeConte, 1851
 Derobrachus thomasi Santos-Silva, 2007
 Derobrachus wappesi Santos-Silva, 2007

References

External links
NLBIF Biodiersity Data Portal

Cerambycidae genera
Prioninae